

See also 
 North Carolina's 5th congressional district special election, 1805
 United States House of Representatives elections, 1804 and 1805
 List of United States representatives from North Carolina

Notes 

1804
North Carolina
United States House of Representatives